Yonca  is a feminine Turkish given name. In Turkish, "Yonca" means "clover". Notable people with the name include:

 Yonca Evcimik (born 1963), Turkish pop singer, dancer, producer and actress
 Yonca Şevval Erdem (born 1996), Turkish water polo player

Turkish feminine given names